Great Catherine may refer to:

Catherine the Great (1729–1796), leader of Russia
Great Catherine: Whom Glory Still Adores, 1913 play by George Bernard Shaw
Great Catherine (film), 1968 British film starring Peter O'Toole, Zero Mostel, Jeanne Moreau, and Jack Hawkins

See also
Katharine the Great, Deborah Davis' 1979 biography of Katharine Graham